Ivan Prosvetov (born March 5, 1999) is a Russian professional ice hockey goaltender who currently plays for the Arizona Coyotes of the National Hockey League (NHL). Prosvetov was selected by the Coyotes, 114th overall, in the 2018 NHL Entry Draft. He played his first NHL game in a relief appearance against the Colorado Avalanche on March 31, 2021.

Career statistics

Awards and honours

References

External links

1999 births
Living people
Ice hockey people from Moscow
Russian ice hockey goaltenders
Arizona Coyotes draft picks
Arizona Coyotes players
Rapid City Rush players
Saginaw Spirit players
Tucson Roadrunners players
Youngstown Phantoms players